Sanilhac may refer to the following places in France:

Sanilhac, Ardèche, a commune in the Ardèche department
Sanilhac, Dordogne, a commune in the Dordogne department
Sanilhac-Sagriès, a commune in the Gard department

See also
 Sanilac (disambiguation)